TRAF family member-associated NF-kappa-B activator is a protein that in humans is encoded by the TANK gene.

Function 

The TRAF (tumor necrosis factor receptor-associated factor) family of proteins associate with and transduce signals from members of the tumor necrosis factor receptor superfamily. The protein encoded by this gene is found in the cytoplasm and can bind to TRAF1, TRAF2, or TRAF3, thereby inhibiting TRAF function by sequestering the TRAFs in a latent state in the cytoplasm. For example, the protein encoded by this gene can block TRAF2 binding to LMP1, the Epstein-Barr virus transforming protein, and inhibit LMP1-mediated NF-kappa-B activation. Two transcript variants encoding different isoforms have been found for this gene.

Interactions 

TANK (gene) has been shown to interact with TANK-binding kinase 1, IKBKE, TRAF2, IKBKG and TRAF3.

References

Further reading

External links